Shaktikanta Das (born 26 February 1957) is serving as the current & 25th governor of the Reserve Bank of India (RBI). He was earlier a member of the FifteenthFinance Commission and India's Sherpa to the G20. Das is a retired 1980batch Indian Administrative Service (IAS) officer of Tamil Nadu cadre.

During his career as an IAS officer, Das served in various capacities for Indian and Tamil Nadu governments, including as Economic Affairs Secretary, Revenue Secretary, Fertilizers Secretary. He has also served as India’s Alternate Governor in the World Bank,         ADB, NDB & AIIB. He has represented India in various international forums like the IMF, G20, BRICS, SAARC, etc.

Early life and education 

Born in Bhubaneswar, Das was schooled at the Demonstration Multipurpose School, Bhubaneswar, and then obtained bachelor's (BA) and master's degrees (MA) in history from the St. Stephen's College at the University of Delhi. He was awarded D.Litt. by Utkal University in 2021.

Career as an IAS officer 

Das served in various positions for both the Government of India and the Government of Tamil Nadu, like as Principal Secretary (Industries), Special Commissioner (Revenue), Secretary (Revenue), Secretary Commercial Taxes, the project director of Tamil Nadu State AIDS Control Society and as the district magistrate and collector of Dindigul and Kancheepuram districts in the Tamil Nadu government; and as Union Economic Affairs Secretary, Union Revenue Secretary, Union Fertilizers Secretary, Special secretary in the Department of Economic Affairs of the Ministry of Finance and as a joint secretary in the Department of Expenditure of the Ministry of Finance in the Indian government.

Das also had a stint with Mahindra Industrial Park Ltd (Mahindra World City), on deputation to a private sector company under Rule6(2)(ii) of the Indian Administrative Service (Cadre) Rules, 1954.

Revenue Secretary 
Das was appointed Union Revenue Secretary by the prime minister-led-Appointments Committee of the Cabinet (ACC) in June 2014, he assumed the office of Secretary on 16 June 2014, and demitted it on 31 August 2015.

Economic Affairs Secretary 
Das was appointed Union Economic Affairs Secretary by the ACC in August 2014, he assumed the office of Secretary on 31 August 2015, and admitted it and simultaneously superannuated from service on 28 May 2017, after being given a three-monthextension by the government.

During his tenure as Union Economic Affairs Secretary, Das was widely regarded as one of the most powerful civil servants in India.

Finance Commission 
Post his retirement from the IAS, Das was appointed a member of the FifteenthFinance Commission by the ACC. In addition, he was appointed as India's Sherpa to the G20 by the ACC. In December 2018, on his appointment as the governor of the Reserve Bank of India, Das resigned from his position in the FifteenthFinance Commission.

Governor of Reserve Bank of India 
Das was appointed Governor of the Reserve Bank of India by the ACC on 11 December 2018 for a period of threeyears, replacing Urjit Patel who had resigned the day before.

Das' appointment as RBI governor received mostly positive responses, with DBS Bank's head of markets for India at Singapore, Ashish Vaidya, saying that previous governors of the RBI with an IAS background, such as Y. Venugopal Reddy and Duvvuri Subbarao, had been successful and that Das' "cordial relations with the government [...] [would] likely help policy negotiations." S. S. Mundra, a former deputy governor of the RBI, said Das was a "good and balanced choice" for RBI governorship and had "a good understanding of the whole of the financial sector both from the ministry and also in his interactions with the RBI."  A former Governor of the Reserve Bank of India C. Rangarajan, said Das had "experience in economic affairs" and would "make a good governor". Gaurav Shah, a senior vice president at Geojit Financial Services, said "a name like Shaktikanta Das carries track record, experience, credentials, credibility and respect along with him."

On the other hand, Nobel laureate and professor at the Massachusetts Institute of Technology, Abhijit Banerjee, said Das' appointment posed a lot of "frightening" questions on governance of autonomous public institutions. Subramanian Swamy, a member of the Bharatiya Janata Party, the largest party of the ruling National Democratic Alliance coalition, and a nominated member of the Rajya Sabha (Council of the States), criticised Das, calling him a "corrupt person" at an event at the Indian School of Business in Hyderabad.

Das assumed charge as RBI governor on 12 December 2018. Reactions of the markets to Das' appointment was positive, with BSE SENSEX gaining 629points and NIFTY 50 increasing by 188points.

As RBI governor, Das serves as the ex-officio chairperson of the Monetary Policy Committee of the central bank.

He was conferred the 'Central Banker of the Year, Asia-Pacific 2020' award by the London based magazine-The Banker for his efforts to make the banking system more robust.

References

External links 

Indian Administrative Service officers
1957 births
Living people
People from Bhubaneswar
Governors of the Reserve Bank of India
Indian diplomats
St. Stephen's College, Delhi alumni